Niels Paarup-Petersen (born 1978) is a Swedish politician.  he serves as Member of the Riksdag representing the constituency of Malmö Municipality. He was also elected as Member of the Riksdag in September 2022. He is affiliated with the Centre Party.

References

External links 
 

Living people
1978 births
Place of birth missing (living people)
21st-century Swedish politicians
Members of the Riksdag 2018–2022
Members of the Riksdag 2022–2026
Members of the Riksdag from the Centre Party (Sweden)